Stephen Patrick Trapmore  (born 18 March 1975) is an English rowing coach and former rower who represented Great Britain at the 2000 Summer Olympics in Sydney. He is currently the High Performance Coach within the Great Britain Olympic Rowing programme, developing athletes and crews to compete at World and Olympic competition.

Education
Trapmore attended Nottingham Trent University and was awarded an honorary degree from there in 2017 in recognition of his contribution to the sport.

Rowing career

Trapmore started rowing at 15 at the Walton Rowing Club. By the age of 17 he was in the Great Britain Junior Team, competing in the Junior World Championships in 1993. As a senior athlete he trained with the Nottinghamshire County Rowing Association, winning his first senior medal in Aiguebelette in 1997. In 2000, he was part of the Great Britain eight that won at the Sydney Olympics, stroking the crew. He has also won a gold, silver and bronze medal at the World Championships as well as wins at Henley Royal Regatta and the Eights Head of the River race with Queen's Tower BC training out of the Imperial College Boat House.

Coaching career

Following his retirement as an athlete in 2002, he began coaching Imperial College in 2007, and was appointed Head Coach there a year later. In 2010, Trapmore accepted the post as Chief Coach of Cambridge University Boat Club, leading them into the 2011 Boat Race campaign.  In the years that followed Steve brought stability to the Cambridge programme developing a robust environment for scholar athletes of all backgrounds to excel in a ruthless but rewarding team environment.  He coached the Light Blues to victory in 2012 and 2016.  In December 2017, it was announced that Trapmore had accepted the role of High Performance Coach within the Great Britain Olympic Rowing programme and would be leaving Cambridge University Boat Club after the 2018 Boat Race.

Personal life 
Trapmore is married to Nicola and has two daughters, Lucy and Anna.

Honours 
Steve was appointed Member of the Order of the British Empire (MBE) in 2001 for services to rowing.

References

External links
 

1975 births
English male rowers
English Olympic medallists
Olympic rowers of Great Britain
Rowers at the 2000 Summer Olympics
Olympic gold medallists for Great Britain
Living people
Olympic medalists in rowing
Medalists at the 2000 Summer Olympics
Members of the Order of the British Empire
World Rowing Championships medalists for Great Britain